Forterra is a manufacturer of building products for the UK’s construction industry. It is listed on the London Stock Exchange.

History
The business was formed as the building products division of Hanson plc, which itself was founded by James Hanson, later Lord Hanson, and Gordon White, later Baron White of Hull in 1964.

Acquisitions included The Butterley Company Ltd in 1968, London Brick PLC in 1984, Red Bank Manufacturing Company and Marshalls Flooring in 2002, Marshalls Clay Products Ltd and Thermalite Ltd in 2005,  and Formpave Holdings Ltd in 2006.

In September 2007, Hanson was acquired by HeidelbergCement, who in March 2015 sold the Company and Hanson’s North American
building products business to Lone Star Funds.

In October 2015, the Company re-branded under the name Forterra plc.

The company gained admission to the London Stock Exchange as an independent listed company in April 2016.

Operations
Forterra's brands include Cradley, Ecostock, Formpave, Jetfloor, London Brick and Thermalite blocks. In 2018, produced over 25% of the supply of bricks in Britain.

References

External links
 Official site

Building materials companies of the United Kingdom
Manufacturing companies based in Northampton
Companies listed on the London Stock Exchange